The Glebe, also known as Minor Hall, is a historic Glebe House located near Amherst, Amherst County, Virginia.  The original section, now the rear ell, was built about 1762, with the two-story, five-bay main block dated to about 1825.  Other additions are the kitchen wing, added about 1919; two porches attached to the south and east elevations and added about 1937; and the laundry room wing, built in the second half of the 20th century. Also on the property are the contributing garage (c. 1900), tool shed (c. 1900), and site of a 20th-century barn.  It was built by the Reverend Ichabod Camp, the only Anglican minister to serve Amherst Parish and the only Anglican minister to occupy The Glebe while it was owned by Amherst Parish between 1762 and 1780.

It was added to the National Register of Historic Places. In this same year, a 50'x25' swimming pool set surrounded by concrete added in the rear of the house approximately 30' away.

References

Houses in Amherst County, Virginia
Houses completed in 1762
Houses on the National Register of Historic Places in Virginia
National Register of Historic Places in Amherst County, Virginia